Eldoret Solar Power station may refer to any of the following:

 Alten Solar Power Station: Located 12 kilometers south-east of Eldoret. Capacity 40 megawatts
 Eldosol Solar Power Station: Located 13 kilometers south-east of Eldoret. Capacity 40 megawatts
 Radiant Solar Power Station: Located 13 kilometers south-east of Eldoret. Capacity 40 megawatts